The Remington Springboard Mile is a Listed American Thoroughbred horse race for two-year-olds over a distance of one mile on the dirt run annually in December at Remington Park located in Oklahoma City, Oklahoma. After peaking in 2019 with a purse of $400,000, the purse was reduced to $200,000 in 2020.  As of 2021, the purse was increased back to $400,000.

Prior to 2009, the race was known as the Remington MEC Mile Stakes.
 Formerly run on the last day of the racing calendar in December at Remington Park, it has since been moved to the Friday night going into the final weekend.

The event was added in 2017 as a qualification race for the Kentucky Derby and stake money had been increasing in the last few years before the COVID-19 pandemic.

Historical race notes
Jockey Cliff Berry, who retired at the end of 2015 as the winningest jockey in the history of Remington Park, won his third Springboard/Mec Mile on December 11, 2010 aboard Grant Jack. The previous day at Remington Park he had won a record setting seven races from seven mounts.

Records (2001-2019)
Speed record:
 1:37.14 @ 1 mile (8 furlongs) - Greyvitos (2017)

Most wins by a jockey:
 3 - Cliff Berry (2003, 2006, 2010)

Most wins by a trainer:
 6 - Steven M. Asmussen (2002, 2004, 2005, 2014, 2018, 2019)
Most wins by an owner:

 No owner has won this race more than once

Winners

External link
Ted's Folly spectacular 2011 win

References

Horse races in the United States
Flat horse races for two-year-olds
Sports in Oklahoma City